Walid Ikhlasi (27 May 1935 – 19 February 2022) was a Syrian novelist, short story writer and playwright.

Life and career 
Born in İskenderun, after getting a degree as an agricultural engineer, Ikhlasi started his career as a writer of short stories in 1954. In 1963 he published Qissas ("Stories"), his first collection of stories, and two years later he debuted as a novelist with Shita al-bahr al-yabis. 

Also an avantgarde playwright, his style is characterized by an experimental, surrealistic and absurdist vein, often mixed with an extreme realistic tone. Among his major themes, is his longing for democracy and freedom. 

Besides his literary activity, Ikhlasi served as a lecturer at the University of Aleppo. He died in Aleppo on 19 February 2022, at the age of 86.

References

External links
 Walid Ikhlasi at Routledge.com

1935 births
2022 deaths 
Syrian novelists
20th-century Syrian writers
Syrian theatre people
Alexandria University alumni
Academic staff of the University of Aleppo
People from İskenderun
Syrian engineers
Agricultural engineers